The 97th Illinois General Assembly convened on January 12, 2011 and adjourned sine die on January 8, 2013. Over that period, the Illinois Senate was in session for 137 legislative days, and the Illinois House was in session for 166 legislative days.

All members of the House, and one-third of the members of the Senate, were elected in the 2010 election. The House and Senate both had Democratic Party majorities during this session.

Legislation 

The 97th General Assembly enacted a total of 1,173 bills into law.

On August 17, 2012, Governor Pat Quinn called the General Assembly into special session to address the Illinois pension crisis. No changes to the state pension system were passed. The House and Senate voted to place the Illinois Public Pension Amendment on the November 2012 ballot, which would have amended the Illinois Constitution to require a 60% majority of both houses for any increase to pension benefits. However, the ballot measure did not achieve the required majority of the popular vote.

As part of the redistricting process following the 2010 US Census, the General Assembly approved new congressional and state legislative maps for the following decade. The new maps for the Illinois House and Senate districts were signed into law by the governor on June 3, 2011.  As a result, several Republican members of the General Assembly were drawn into the same district. Republican leaders of the House and Senate sued to block the map, but a three-judge panel dismissed their suit in December 2011.

Senate 

Under the 1970 Illinois Constitution, the Illinois Senate has 59 members, who are elected to overlapping two- and four-year terms. All 59 Senate seats are up for election following decennial redistricting. Because 2010 was the last election year before redistricting based on the 2010 census, the 21 senators elected in 2010 were all elected to two-year terms.

Senate leadership

Party composition 

The Senate of the 97th General Assembly consisted of 24 Republicans and 35 Democrats.

State Senators

House 

The Illinois House has 118 members, who all serve two-year terms. 

On August 17, 2012, the House expelled Derrick Smith based on bribery allegations. This was the first time either chamber of the General Assembly had expelled a member since 1905. However, Smith was reelected to the House in November.

Party composition 

The House of the 97th General Assembly consisted of 54 Republicans and 64 Democrats.

House leadership

State Representatives

See also 
112th United States Congress
List of Illinois state legislatures

Works cited 

 
Legislative District Maps
Legislators' Portraits and Biographies

References 

2011 in Illinois
2012 in Illinois
Illinois legislative sessions
2011 U.S. legislative sessions
2012 U.S. legislative sessions